Mary Therese Hansen (1 November 1966 9 December 2002) was an Australian-born guitarist and singer. She joined the London-based avant-pop band Stereolab in 1992. As a member, Hansen recorded six studio albums from Transient Random-Noise Bursts with Announcements (August 1993) to Sound-Dust (August 2001).

As a side-project, in late 1999 she formed the space rock group Schema with members of Seattle-based band Hovercraft, and they issued their debut album, Schema, on 19 September 2000. On 9 December 2002, Hansen was killed after being struck by a truck while bicycling in London.

Biography

Early life 
Mary Therese Hansen was born on 1 November 1966 in Maryborough, Queensland, Australia. Her father, Brendan Percival Hansen, OAM (19221999), was a trade unionist and Australian Labor Party parliamentarian; and her mother, Moira Ann Hansen (née O'Sullivan), was a light opera singer and is contributor to the Maryborough arts community. Hansen and her family were of Irish Catholic and Danish descent. Her parents were married at St Mary's Catholic Church, Maryborough in 1960. She was one of eight children, with her brothers (John, Tim and Gerry) and four sisters (Jenny, Maureen, Susie and Kate). Hansen was trained by her mother and entered eisteddfodau. She left secondary school at age 17 and worked in a bank.

Career 
By 1988, Hansen had moved to London and worked in various jobs. She soon became a backing singer with the Essex-based indie band the Wolfhounds. She met guitarist Tim Gane when the Wolfhounds performed alongside his indie pop band, McCarthy. Gane formed Stereolab, in 1990 with Lætitia Sadier (ex-McCarthy). Hansen joined Stereolab as second vocalist and guitarist in 1992. She also contributed percussion, keyboards, and occasional lead vocals. As a member of that band, Hansen recorded six studio albums from Transient Random-Noise Bursts with Announcements (August 1993) to Sound-Dust (August 2001).

Outside of her work with Stereolab, Hansen sang on records by Brokeback, The High Llamas, Moonshake, and Mouse on Mars. She was a record producer, keyboard player and vocalist for the London underground group Chicano.

In late 1999, Hansen combined with Seattle-formed space rock group Hovercraft to form Schema. An eponymous maxi-EP/mini-album was released on 19 September 2000 on avant-garde Kill Rock Stars imprint, 5 Rue Christine. AllMusic's François Couture described their style as "space rock, psychedelic rock, ambient pop, and artsy avant-rock" with the feature track being "Echolalia... Curvilinear" with its "ethereal female vocals, lots of guitar noise, and a driving rhythm section".

Death 
On 9 December 2002, a truck hit and killed Hansen while she was riding her bicycle in London. Just before her death, she had bought a block of land in Maryborough, as she frequently spent time there with her family. Stereolab's subsequent release, Margerine Eclipse (2004) was dedicated to Hansen, with its track 'Feel and Triple' being a tribute to her.

In 2004, Hybird, an EP of some of Hansen's music, was released posthumously. It also featured her artwork, contained three tracks which had been released in limited editions before her death, and a final track which was finished by Stereolab's Andy Ramsay.

References

External links
 Times obituary
 The Guardian obituary

1966 births
2002 deaths
Australian people of Danish descent
Australian people of Irish descent
Women rock singers
Road incident deaths in London
Cycling road incident deaths
Stereolab members
People from Maryborough, Queensland
Australian women guitarists
20th-century Australian women singers
21st-century Australian women singers
20th-century guitarists
21st-century guitarists
20th-century women guitarists
21st-century women guitarists